Premi No.1  is a 2005 Odia film directed by Debu Pattnaik. The film stars Anuvab Mohanty, Koel Mallick, Rahul Dev. It is a remake of the Telugu film Dil starring Nitin.

Plot
The story of Premi No. 1 revolves round Rohit (Anuvab Mohanty). He was sent to town by his father for higher studies; in college he falls in love with Preiti (Koel Mallick), the sister of the town's famous goon, Ranjit (Rahul Dev). A rivalry grows between Rohit and Ranjit – after several incidents ultimately Ranjit allows his sister to marry Rohit.

Cast
 Anuvab Mohanty as Rohit
 Koel Mallick as Preeti
 Rahul Dev as Ranjit

Soundtrack
 "E Sara Duniare Khiojile Paiba Nahin Mo Pari Premi" — Kumar Bapi & Tapu
 "Emiti Jhia Ku Mun Karichi Mo Priya" — Kumar Bapi
 "To Naan Re Mun Gote Geeta Lekhichi" — T. Souri & Tapu Mishra
 "Tu Nahin Kichi Mate Bhala Lagu Nahin O My Love" — Udit Narayan & Ira Mohanty

References

External links
 

2005 films
Bengali-language Indian films
Odia remakes of Telugu films
2000s Odia-language films